Bronza M. "Bronzie" Parks (died May 13, 1958) was an American boatbuilder from Wingate, Maryland. Parks was the last builder of Chesapeake Bay skipjack sailing vessels.

Personal life
Parks was married to Katie Lewis with whom he had five daughters: Irene, Joyce, Lucille, Martha, and Mary. At the time of his death in 1958, Parks was a candidate for Dorchester County commissioner and president of the Lakes-Straits Fire Department.

Boatbuilding
Parks began building boats at the age of 16 and completed more than 400 vessels during his career. He built his first skipjack, the Wilma Lee, in 1940. The last three skipjacks that Parks completed were the Rosie Parks and the Martha Lewis in 1955 and the Lady Katie in 1956.

Death
In 1958, Parks was working on an  skipjack-style sailboat for Willis C. Rowe of Silver Spring, Maryland. During a confrontation with Parks on May 13, 1958, regarding the cost of the project Rowe shot the boatbuilder three times killing him. Rowe was eventually convicted of second degree murder and sentenced to 18 years in prison.

References

1958 deaths
American boat builders
Year of birth missing
Deaths by firearm in Maryland
People from Dorchester County, Maryland
People murdered in Maryland
Skipjacks
American murder victims
1958 murders in the United States